Kanagaratnam Thavalingam is a Sri Lankan Tamil geographer and former Surveyor General of Sri Lanka.

Thavalingam is from Kaithady in northern Sri Lanka. He was educated at the Jaffna Hindu College. He is a fellow of the Surveyors Institute (of Sri Lanka) and a member of the institute's council.

Thavalingam was Senior Deputy Surveyor General and Additional Surveyor General. He became the 45th Surveyor General in 2013.

References

Alumni of Jaffna Hindu College
Living people
People from Northern Province, Sri Lanka
Sri Lankan Tamil geographers
Surveyors General of Sri Lanka
Year of birth missing (living people)